Bevan is an unincorporated community in Washington County, in the U.S. state of Ohio.

History
A post office called Bevan was established in 1897, and remained in operation until 1932. The Bevan brothers operated a general store there.

References

Unincorporated communities in Washington County, Ohio
Unincorporated communities in Ohio